A list of notable Uruguayan economists:

Isaac Alfie
Azucena Arbeleche
Danilo Astori
Ana Balsa (Universidad de Montevideo)
Mario Bergara
Javier Bianchi (Federal Reserve Bank  of Minneapolis)
Lorenzo Caliendo (University of Chicago)
Germán Cubas (University of Houston)
Alberto Couriel
Ariel Davrieux
Ramón Díaz
Juan Dubra (Universidad de Montevideo) 
Federico Echenique (Caltech)
Ana Fostel (University of Virginia)
Enrique V. Iglesias
Omar Licandro (University of Nottingham)
Fernando Lorenzo
Daniel Olesker
Arturo C. Porzecanski
Martín Rama (World Bank)
Diego Restuccia (University of Toronto)
Alejandro Végh Villegas
Carlos Vegh (Johns Hopkins)

 
Economist
Uruguayan